Shanbally Castle was located near Clogheen, County Tipperary and built for Cornelius O'Callaghan, the first Viscount Lismore, in around 1810. It was the largest house built in Ireland by the noted English architect John Nash. The castle was acquired by the Irish Land Commission in 1954. On 21 March 1960 the castle, after much controversy, was demolished.

Destruction
The protests against the demolition of Shanbally Castle came from some local sources, An Taisce, a few academics such as Professor Gwynn and some political voices such as Senator Sean Moylan, the Minister for Agriculture until his death in November 1957, and TD from Mitchelstown, John W Moher. Politically, the Fianna Fáil Government had no love for houses of the ascendancy and local TD Michael Davern was in favour of its demolition.

For a brief period it seemed that a purchaser could be found in the form of the London theatre critic Edward Charles Sackville-West, 5th Baron Sackville, who had a tremendous love of the Clogheen area, which he had known since childhood.

When this sale did not happen, the Irish Government claimed that it could not find another suitable owner for the castle.

In March 1960, The Nationalist reported the final end of a building which was once the pride of the neighbourhood. "A big bang yesterday ended Shanbally Castle, where large quantities of gelignite and cortex shattered the building," it said.

A statement from the Irish Government released after the demolition of the Castle said in response to protests favouring the retention of Shanbally Castle for the nation: "Apart from periods of military occupation the castle remained wholly unoccupied for 40 years".

References

External links
 Explosions Rip Through Shanbally Castle

Castles in County Tipperary